Arman Azatovich Adamian (born 14 February 1997) is a Russian judoka. He won the gold medal in the men's 100 kg event at the 2019 European Games held in Minsk, Belarus.

In 2018, he won the silver medal in the men's 100 kg event at the Judo Grand Prix Antalya held in Antalya, Turkey. In that same year, he won the gold medal in the men's 100 kg event at the 2018 European U23 Judo Championships held in Győr, Hungary. In 2020, he won the silver medal in the men's 100 kg event at the European Judo Championships held in Prague, Czech Republic.

In 2021, he won one of the bronze medals in his event at the Judo World Masters held in Doha, Qatar. At the 2021 Judo Grand Slam Abu Dhabi held in Abu Dhabi, United Arab Emirates, he won the gold medal in his event.

References

External links
 

Living people
1997 births
Place of birth missing (living people)
Russian male judoka
Judoka at the 2019 European Games
European Games gold medalists for Russia
European Games medalists in judo
21st-century Russian people